Tinissa is a genus of the fungus moth family 
(Tineidae). Therein, it belongs to the subfamily Scardiinae.

Species
Tinissa albipuncta Robinson, 1976
Tinissa amboinensis Robinson, 1976
Tinissa apicimaculata Yang & Li, 2012
Tinissa araucariae Robinson, 1976
Tinissa bakeri Robinson, 1976
Tinissa baliomicta Meyrick, 1928
Tinissa chalcites Robinson, 1976
Tinissa chaotica Robinson, 1976
Tinissa cinerascens Meyrick, 1910
Tinissa classeyi Robinson, 1981
Tinissa conchata Yang & Li, 2012
Tinissa connata Yang & Li, 2012
Tinissa convoluta Robinson, 1976
Tinissa cultellata Gozmány & Vári, 1973
Tinissa distracta Meyrick, 1916
Tinissa dohertyi Robinson, 1976
Tinissa errantia Robinson, 1976
Tinissa eumetrota Meyrick, 1926
Tinissa goliath Robinson, 1976
Tinissa indica Robinson, 1976
Tinissa insignis Zagulajev, 1972
Tinissa insularia Robinson, 1976
Tinissa kidukaroka Robinson, 1976
Tinissa krakatoa Robinson, 1976
Tinissa leguminella Yang & Li, 2012
Tinissa mysorensis Robinson, 1976
Tinissa palmodes Meyrick, 1917
Tinissa parallela Robinson, 1976
Tinissa philippinensis Robinson, 1976
Tinissa phrictodes Meyrick, 1910
Tinissa poliophasma Bradley, 1965
Tinissa polysema Zagulajev, 1972
Tinissa polystacta (Meyrick, 1918) (=Polymnestra perilithas Meyrick, 1927)
Tinissa rigida Meyrick, 1910 (= Tinissa chloroplocama Meyrick, 1938, Tinissa heterograpta Meyrick, 1928)
Tinissa ruwenzorica Gozmány, 1966
Tinissa spaniastra Meyrick, 1932
Tinissa spirella Yang & Li, 2012
Tinissa torvella Walker, 1864
Tinissa transversella (Walker, 1864)
Tinissa wayfoongi Robinson & Tuck, 1998
Tinissa yaloma Robinson, 1981

References

Scardiinae